Mezzerschmitt is a Norwegian black metal band, a spinoff of Mayhem. It was formed in 2000 by Mayhem members Jan Axel Blomberg (Hellhammer) and Rune Eriksen (Blasphemer), collaborating with Lars Sørensen from Red Harvest. They intended to create an industrial metal band, but their sound soon shifted towards black metal while still incorporating industrial elements. Mezzerschmitt have released only one EP so far, Weltherrschaft.

The band was incorrectly associated with supporting Nazism due to the band's image resembling with Nazi Germany's uniforms, symbol use, etc., as well as having German language pseudonyms and song titles. Eriksen stated that Weltherrschaft is an imaginary place created in his mind. The purpose of the band would be to let out steam, while being non-political.

Band members
Herr Schmitt  (Rune Eriksen, Blasphemer) - Vocals, guitars, bass
Oberleutnant LS (Lars Sørensen) - Keyboards
Hauptman Hammer (Jan Axel Blomberg, Hellhammer) - Drums

Discography
Weltherrschaft (EP, 2002)

Sources

2002 EP Review - Rock Hard
2002 EP Review - Metal.de

External links
Mezzerschmitt page at Season of Mist
Mezzerschmitt at Encyclopaedia Metallum
Mezzerschmitt at BNR Metal pages

Norwegian black metal musical groups
Musical groups established in 2000
2000 establishments in Norway
Season of Mist artists
Musical groups from Norway with local place of origin missing